For the American composer, see Daniel Gregory Mason.

Daniel Mason (b. ca. 1976) is an American novelist and physician. He is the author of The Piano Tuner and A Far Country.  He was raised in Palo Alto, California, and received a BA in biology from Harvard University, later graduating from the UCSF School of Medicine. He wrote his first novel, The Piano Tuner, while still a medical student. It was later the basis for a 2004 opera of the same name (composed by Nigel Osborne to a libretto by Amanda Holden).  Mason's second novel, A Far Country, was published in March 2007. His work has been published in 28 countries. He is married to the novelist Sara Houghteling.

In May 2020, Mason was the recipient of the $50,000 Simpson/Joyce Carol Oates Literary Prize.

Mason is a psychiatrist affiliated with Stanford Hospital, and teaches literature at Stanford University.

Books
The Piano Tuner - 2002
A Far Country - 2007
Death of the Pugilist, or The Famous Battle of Jacob Burke & Blindman McGraw - 2008 
The Winter Soldier - 2018
A Registry of My Passage upon the Earth - 2020

See also
 Physician writer

References

External links 
 Interview with Mason at identitytheory.com
 Review of The Piano Tuner by Michiko Kakutani in The New York Times

21st-century American novelists
American male novelists
Harvard University alumni
University of California, San Francisco alumni
Living people
21st-century American male writers
Year of birth missing (living people)